Colonel Blood may refer to:
Colonel James Blood (1833–1885), former Commander of the 6th Missouri and the second husband of Victoria Woodhull
Colonel James Clinton Blood (1819–1894), first mayor of Lawrence, Kansas
Thomas Blood (1618–1680), Irish officer, self-styled colonel, and rogue in both England and Ireland.  Noted for having tried to steal Britain's Crown Jewels.
Colonel Blood (film), a 1934 film depicting the life of Thomas Blood, directed by W. P. Lipscomb
Colonel Blood (album), a 2012 album by Fighting with Wire